The Nip Drivers were an American punk rock band formed in 1980 in Torrance, California. The band was the brainchild of lead singer Mike Webber, and for a time included guitarist Kurt Schellenbach, Janus Jones on bass, and Nick Passiglia on drums, though the lineup at any given time was fluid. They played fast hardcore punk, often infused with humor and a total lack of political correctness. In addition to their own compositions, they recorded sometimes improbable covers of pop hits such as Olivia Newton-John’s “Have You Never Been Mellow,” Duran Duran's "Rio," and Sweet’s “Fox on the Run”. The last is heard on the soundtrack of the 1984 film Desperate Teenage Lovedolls. The band also made a cameo appearance in the 1985 film Echo Park starring Susan Dey and Tom Hulce.

After a period of inactivity, Webber emerged with an all-new line-up in the 1990s. In 2000, the 1980s LPs were reissued on CD. In 1999 Mike started an acoustic project called the Bob Drivers with Jula Bell (Bulimia Banquet, Bobsled, Miss Derringer)where Mike played acoustic guitar and Jula played punk rock autoharp. The name was a play on Bobsled+Nip Drivers, henceforth, The Bob Drivers. In 2001 Mike emerged with the last Nip Drivers line up.  He used his other band Marc Spitz Freestyle, as his back up band. The other members included Jula Bell on bass and b.u.vox, Greg Cameron (SWA, October Faction) on drums, and Dave Wakefield (Sukia) on guitar. They recorded 4 new Nip Driver songs that are due for release in Winter of 2020. Mike Webber died on November 11, 2006. The last show that the Nip Drivers played before Mike died was with the Nip Drivers/MSF at the Liquid Kitty Punk Rock BBQ in West LA August 13, 2006.

Discography
 Destroy Whitey (12" EP, 1984, New Alliance Records)
 Oh Blessed Freak Show (LP, 1985, Bemisbrain/Enigma)
 Nip Drivers (7” EP, 1990, No Reality—this is sometimes referred to as the ‘’Pretty Face’’ EP)
 Dirt My Hole (7” EP, 1995, Fearless)
 Destroy Whitey/Oh Blessed Freak Show (CD reissue, 2000, Taang! Records)

Compilation appearances
 Party or Go Home (1983, Mystic Records)
 Includes "Tang"
 Desperate Teenage Lovedolls (1984, Enigma)
 Includes "Fox on the Run"
 When Men were Men... and Sheep were Scared (1985, Bemisbrain)
 Includes “Rio” and “E.Y.O.B.”

References

External links
Nip Drivers in concert
Cosmichearse.blogspot.com
IMDb.com
Slope Records Re-issue

Hardcore punk groups from California
Pop punk groups from California
Musical groups established in 1980
Musical groups disestablished in 2000